The white-footed fox (Vulpes vulpes pusilla), also known as the desert fox, is a small, Asiatic subspecies of red fox which occurs throughout most of northwestern Indian subcontinent, Pakistan's desert districts from Rawalpindi to Rajasthan and Kutch in India, Baluchistan, southern Iran, and Iraq. It is mostly found on sand-hills or in the broad sandy beds of semi-dry rivers, and only very rarely in fields, and then in the vicinity of sandy tracts.

Description 

Like the Turkmenian fox, the white-footed fox has a primitive, infantile skull compared to those of its northern cousins. It is smaller than the Afghan red fox and Hill foxes, and never exhibits a red phase in its winter coat, nor the silvery, hoary phase of the Afghan red fox. It closely resembles the unrelated Bengal fox in size, but is distinguished by its longer tail and hind feet. As adults, their pelts are easily distinguished from other subspecies by the presence of a very distinct pale patch on each sides of the back behind the shoulders, which is overlapped by a dark, transverse stripe over the shoulders in front of the light patches. The colour on the back varies from brownish yellow to rusty red with slight admixture of white, while the flanks are whitish or greyish. The outer surface of the limbs are iron-grey or rufous, while the inner side of the forelegs and the whole front of the hind legs are white. The face is rufous, with dark markings around the eyes. The underparts are slaty in hue. The chin and the centre of the chest is white. The ear-tips are black or dark brown and paler at the base, lined with whitish hairs. The tail is almost the same colour as the back, but is less rufous on the sides and beneath. Most of the tail's hairs are black, and may form a dark ring at the end of the tail. The tip is white.

Behavior 

It is similar in habits to the hill fox, but its diet is more carnivorous than that of other subspecies, and its prey is more restricted to gerbils and sand rats, due to the more barren habitat it occupies.

Gallery

References

Works cited

Vulpes
Mammals of Pakistan
Mammals described in 1854
Mammals of India